Shaheen Khan (born 28 June 1987) is a South African first-class cricketer. He was included in the Western Province squad for the 2016 Africa T20 Cup.

References

External links
 

1987 births
Living people
South African cricketers
Cape Cobras cricketers
Gauteng cricketers
Western Province cricketers
Cricketers from Cape Town